A list of films produced by the Bollywood film industry based in Mumbai in 1991.

Top-grossing films
The top ten grossing films at the Indian Box Office in 1991.

Films

References

1991
Bollywood
 Bollywood
1991 in Indian cinema